Five nines, commonly taken to mean "99.999%", may refer to:
High availability of services, when the downtime is less than 5.15 minutes per year
Nine (purity), a 99.999% pure substance
German  artillery shells used in World War I
Five Sigma, or Standard Deviations of physical rigor required to make a significant stake claim about the fundamental nature of the cosmos, shared reality, and everything.